Air Marshal George Owen Johnson  CB, MC (January 24, 1896 – March 28, 1980) was a Canadian aviator, World War I Flying Ace and a senior commander in the Royal Canadian Air Force during World War II.

Military career

World War I service
Born in Woodstock, Ontario in 1896, George Owen Johnson initially served as a subaltern with the Corps of School Cadet Instructors (CSCI) (now known as Cadet Instructors Cadre (CIC)) from 1913 to 1916. He was accepted for the Royal Naval Air Service (RNAS) in Canada, but transferred to the Royal Flying Corps before going overseas in May 1917. Serving with No. 84 Squadron RAF he became an ace with one aircraft destroyed, two shared aircraft destroyed, and three 'out of control'. Later, serving with No. 24 Squadron RAF, he was credited with one aircraft destroyed, one shared balloon destroyed, two 'out of control', and one shared aircraft captured including Leut. Kurt Wüsthoff. In total he was credited with 11 victories. He also crash landed three times.

He trained at No. 24 Training Squadron RFC and "A" Squadron Central Flying School RFC (now known as the Central Flying School), starting on July 7, 1917, graduating with 54 hours flight time, 38 hours 10 minutes of which was solo, on September 27, 1917 after an 85-day course of instruction.

He served as a fighter pilot in Royal Aircraft Factory S.E.5 aircraft (According to aviation author Robert Jackson, the S.E.5 was: "the nimble fighter that has since been described as the 'Spitfire of World War One'") on the Western Front—in No. 84 Squadron RAF, 22 October 1917 to 18 April 1918; in No. 24 Squadron RAF, 18 April to 19 June 1918. He was awarded the Military Cross (MC)  and Croix de Guerre avec Etoile en Bronze.

His MC citation read in part:

"He has destroyed two hostile machines, has driven down two others out of control, and has always displayed the greatest courage and coolness in the most difficult situations."

Interwar years
In July 1919 he returned to Canada and was appointed officer commanding, War Trophy Party, Canada, July 1919 to January 1920. Working with a team of approximately fifty men he assembled enemy aircraft for (mostly static) display in Canada. Several of these aircraft remain on display in Canadian Museums, including an AEG G.IV, a Junkers J.I, and a Fokker D.VII.

He was commissioned as a flight lieutenant in the Canadian Air Force (1920–24) in 1920. (His service number was C4—just four).

He was appointed superintendent of Camp Borden (now known as CFB Borden), previously "the wartime home of the RAF Canada flying training scheme. It included machine-shops, schools, garages, offices, quarters and messes, a central heating plant, paved roads, a swimming pool, golf course, and tennis courts. Most important, there were eighteen hangars each able to house ten aircraft."

But when he arrived January 1920, he found the buildings deserted, except for a caretaker and his assistant. With a crew of 9 men, he set about assembling the aircraft of the Imperial Gift. 

He was part of the crew for the first trans Canada flight in October 1920, serving as navigator from Ottawa to Winnipeg. This leg of the flight was also the first crossing of Lake Superior by air.

He was then appointed to the permanent force, Royal Canadian Air Force, in April 1924 and was posted to RCAF Headquarters as Assistant Director of Air Staff and Personnel. In 1925, his service record noted that he was "Qualified as Certificate Examiner & authorized to carry out inspections and examinations of Air Harbours, Air Engineers and Private and Commercial Air Pilots"

He was then appointed Commander Air Station Trenton (now known as CFB Trenton) for two years (1934–36). This coincided with the completion of No. 28 Unemployment Relief Project, with provision of an administration building, a seaplane hangar plus apron, a landplane hangar, a barrack block, ten married airmen's quarters, a married quarter for the station commanding officer, a senior warrant officers' quarter, roads, sidewalks, drainage, sewage, water supply and boost pump, and a surfaced parade ground. During his tenure, "It was also noted that eight relief personnel were employed to peel potatoes by hand and the base commander pointed out the waste, not only of labour but of the potatoes, involved in this method. He urged the provision of a mechanical peeler which he had earlier requisitioned without success. By obtaining the sympathetic ear of the Chief of General Staff, consideration was given to the early provision of a mechanical peeler.", demonstrating that issues of procurement are not new in the RCAF. His service record notes he completed the "Annual Musketry Course" in 1936.

He attended Imperial Defence College (1936–37) (now known as Royal College of Defence Studies), and in March 1938 was appointed first Commanding Officer of RCAF Western Air Command, based in Vancouver at the Jericho Beach Seaplane base.

Throughout this period he was involved in the expansion of civil and military aviation, the use of aircraft in the exploration and mapping of Canada, exploring their use in mining, forestry, forest fire fighting and the creation of national and international air mail service.

He said of his interwar service it "was attempting to make bricks without straw", referring to the meager government appropriations and constant lack of equipment.

World War II service
He was made Air Member for Organization and Training (October 1939) and began work on creating and executing the British Commonwealth Air Training Plan. He presented the ‘Wings’ to the first graduating class under the BCATP at Camp Borden. During this period he was an early and enthusiastic supporter of the creation of the Royal Canadian Air Force Women's Division, although the idea did not become operational until July 1940.

He then served as Deputy Chief of Air Staff (November 1940). In 1941, he was instrumental in framing and negotiating the agreement with the RAF that led to the creation of Canadian Air Groups (as opposed to just squadrons), allowing RCAF officers overseas staff command experience. In September 1941, he made a national broadcast on the Canadian Broadcasting Corporation updating Canadians on the progress and growth of the BCATP and the development of the Northwest Staging Route, the string of air stations used to supply Alaska and ferry aircraft to Russia. He was also instrumental in retaining Canadian command of Eastern Air Command, the Royal Canadian Air Force units patrolling the Western Atlantic. When “Admiral H.R. Stark, Chief of (US) Naval Operations in Washington, wrote to the Canadian Chief of Air Staff inviting him "to place such air forces as are assigned to perform ocean escort duty under the command, for this purpose only, of the Commander-in-Chief, U.S. Atlantic Fleet, this action to be taken under the authority and subject to the limitations contained in ABC-22...". The Canadian Cabinet War Committee felt that since the navy was obliged to accept American command for oceanic convoy work the RCAF ought to do so as well. The only objection that would be considered was one on operational grounds. The Deputy Chief of Air Staff, Air Vice-Marshal G.O. Johnson, therefore argued that since the RCAF now operated very successfully in co-operation with, rather than under the control of, the RN and RCN there was no need to adopt different relationships with the USN.”

He was promoted to Acting Air Marshal while deputized for the Chief of the Air Staff during the Ottawa Conference held in May and June 1942 where he was in charge of the arrangements and the planning of material for discussion. The result of the conference was an extension of the British Commonwealth Air Training Plan to see it through the end of the war, and the entry of the Americans into the plan.

He was appointed AOC No.1 Training Command of the British Commonwealth Air Training Plan in July 1942. On August 7, 1942 his service record was amended to note he had been awarded the "Polish Air Force Pilots Badge"

He then became AOC RCAF Eastern Air Command in January 1943. This time is widely considered the turning point in the Battle of the Atlantic when allied tactics and technology combined to turn the tide against the U-Boats. After taking command from AVM Cuffe, Johnson restructured relationships with the RCN and American forces, integrated new technology into the command (VLR Liberators, acoustic sonobuoys, homing torpedoes, enigma intercepts, radio direction finding sets, improved radars) to decisive effect. After the Atlantic Convoy Conference in spring 1943, he assumed “General Operational Control” in of all Allied Air Forces in the Canadian sector of the Western Atlantic, in a model considered a forerunner of the current Canadian/USA model of strategic cooperation. This was partly a result of Johnson's work both as DCAS RCAF and AOC EAC. “The creation of the Canadian Northwest Atlantic Command was a significant accomplishment in Canada’s military history. It marked the first time Canadian naval and Air Force commanders had commander in chief status in an active theatre of war.” In August 1943, F/O Howes made the first trans-Atlantic patrol flight in a VLR Liberator closing the ‘air gap’. By late 1944 the ‘Battle of the Atlantic’ was considered won. Writing shortly after the war ended, Admiral Karl Dônitz noted that it was the "enemy air force" that was "the greatest problem for the U-boat command."

He became AOC-in-C RCAF Overseas in April 1945, serving to July 1946. He was occupied with completing the plans to redeploy the RCAF component of the 'Tiger Force' from bases in Europe to the Pacific Theatre via Canada, where they were to refit and train for the new mission and "to oversee the repatriation of RCAF personnel and to administer the RCAF's thirteen-squadron contribution to the British Air Forces of Occupation (Germany)."

The RCAF Overseas had grown over the course of the war to 48 squadrons. While they made their best known contributions in the high-intensity operations over North-West Europe, where Canadian bomber squadrons formed no. 6 Group, Bomber Command, And RCAF Fighter squadrons served in Canadian wings, No. 417 Squadron flew fighters in North Africa and the Mediterranean, and three bomber squadrons operated from North Africa. Two transport squadrons and a maritime patrol squadron were in the South East Asia theatre based in Burma and Ceylon. An additional 47,000 RCAF personnel were serving in RAF squadrons around the world.

In his speech at the 'Waving off' ceremony for Tiger Force, Johnson said "You are now making history as the first British Squadrons to fly across the Atlantic as squadrons. This is an indication that in future wars, if wars come, the Canadian Air Force will fly to war as squadrons."

He was awarded the Commander of the Bath (Military). the Legion of Merit (Commander) and the Légion d'honneur (Commandeur) as a result of his World War II service. He retired as Air Marshal in 1947, "Because he is not advantageously employable in his present rank".

His CB citation read in part:

"Air Vice Marshal Johnson, as Deputy Chief of the Air Staff, was responsible for the excellent planning and construction of the vast number of stations required for the successful operation of the British Commonwealth Air Training Plan as well as the increased Home War plans."

Hugh Halliday, the noted RCAF historian, quoted Johnson as saying “It should be clearly understood that Commanding Officers who recommend recognition of the work of their subordinates are much more highly thought of by superior formations than those who do not.”

Personal life
Johnson married Jean Eleanor McKay (1894-1968) in 1924, and they had two children, Jean Margaret (1930-1995) and Doreen Eleanor (1933-2008). He married Sarah Jane ('Bobby') Roberts RRC (1896-1977) in 1969.

After living for some years post retirement in Florida, he returned to Canada in the 1960s and lived the remainder of his life in Vancouver, BC. He was always in attendance at the annual Remembrance Day Dawn Patrol breakfast held by the Air Force Officers' Association of Vancouver.

Legacy
There was a school named in his honour at the Royal Canadian Air Force base and training school in Summerside, Prince Edward Island. The Air Marshal Johnson School opened its doors in 1949 and served as an elementary school for the children of Canadian Forces personnel from Kindergarten through Grade VIII until the base was closed in 1989.

Some memorabilia and his medal set reside at the National Air Force Museum of Canada.

According to Air Marshal Robert Leckie:

"During Air Marshal Johnson's many senior appointments in the Royal Canadian Air Force, including his responsibilities in such positions as Deputy Chief of Air Staff, and Air Officer Commanding in Chief of Eastern Air Command and the Royal Canadian Air Force Overseas, he at all times was considered a brilliant leader and an inspiration to those with whom he came in contact."

References

External links
Royal Air Force Museum, RFC Casualty form
London Gazette June 22, 1918 Military Cross
London Gazette March 29, 1927 Croix de Guerre with Bronze Star award
London Gazette June 2, 1942 CB award
TheAerodrome.com World War I memorial site
Johnson's WWI pilots log
Royal Canadian Air Force honours list World War I
Royal Canadian Air Force honours list World War II
The First 1,000 RCAF Service Numbers
His portrait at The Canadian War Museum - Image not public domain
Commanders of the CAF/RCAF, career outline, pages 15-17
Another Kind of Justice: Canadian Military Law from Confederation to Somalia Published in 1999 by UBC Press. Author Chris Madsen  (page 91).

|-
 

|-

|-

Canadian military personnel of World War I
Canadian World War I flying aces
Canadian Companions of the Order of the Bath
Recipients of the Croix de Guerre 1914–1918 (France)
Commanders of the Legion of Merit
Canadian recipients of the Military Cross
Royal Air Force personnel of World War I
Royal Canadian Air Force air marshals of World War II
Royal Flying Corps officers
Royal Naval Air Service aviators
Commandeurs of the Légion d'honneur
People from Woodstock, Ontario
1896 births
1980 deaths
Canadian military personnel from Ontario
Graduates of the Royal College of Defence Studies